Seamus McGrane (1956 – 25 May 2019) was an Irish dissident republican, co-founder of the Real Irish Republican Army, and leader of a splinter group called Óglaigh na hÉireann.

Real IRA
McGrane joined his former Provisional IRA colleague Michael McKevitt at the formation of the Real IRA at a meeting in a remote farmhouse near Oldcastle in Co Meath in November, 1997. The two had resigned from the Provisional IRA, where McKevitt was quartermaster general, when the terrorist organisation decided earlier that year to begin decommissioning of its arsenal. Alongside McKevitt – the brother-in-law of IRA hunger striker Bobby Sands – McGrane founded the hardline anti-ceasefire Real IRA. These dissident Republican groups were opposed to the Good Friday Agreement and the peace process and were committed to continuing with an armed struggle against forces of occupation. At the formation meeting of the Real IRA, McGrane was appointed director of training for the new dissident organisation. Seamus McGrane was chair of the Provisional IRA Executive when the organisation split over accepting the Mitchell Principles. He played a leading role as chairman of the IRA's Army Executive in mounting serious opposition to the attempts by the Sinn Fein president Gerry Adams to depart from the original principles of the organisation.

Óglaigh na hÉireann
McGrane led a split from the Real IRA in 2009, leading the splinter group Óglaigh na hÉireann until he was arrested. He would be only the second person to be convicted of directing terrorism in the Republic of Ireland. In 2017, at a non-jury three-judge Special Criminal Court sitting in Dublin, McGrane was sentenced to 11 and a half years in prison for directing terrorism and being a member of an illegal organisation. McGrane was convicted of directing the activities of an unlawful organisation between April 19 and May 13, 2015. He was also convicted of being a member of the IRA between January 2010 and May 2015. At his trial the judge ruled that there was "the clearest evidence of directing an illegal organisation" and that "McGrane was leader of a splinter dissident group formed in 2008, known as Óglaigh na hÉireann", which was a distinct entity and operated “in a different capacity” from the Real IRA. 

At the time of his final arrest Seamus McGrane had allegedly planned a bomb attack in 2015 during Prince Charles' visit to Ireland. 

It was the third time that McGrane had been imprisoned by the state. The first period of imprisonment was for IRA membership in 1976 for which he had spent one year in custody. The second conviction was in 1999 when he had been captured training recruits in the use of firearms, during a Real IRA training session for which he was jailed for four years also by the Special Criminal Court. The arrest followed an operation carried out by the Garda, Emergency Response Unit.

Seamus McGrane died in prison on May 25, 2019.

References 

2019 deaths
Irish republicans
Real Irish Republican Army members
1956 births